History is the study of the past.

History may also refer to:

General
 History of the Earth 
 Human history
 Natural history
 Philosophy of history

Arts, entertainment, and media

Literature
 History (Herodotus), properly Histories
 History (Malmesbury) (Gesta Regum Anglorum) of William of Malmesbury
 History (novel), a novel by Elsa Morante
 "History" (short story), a 1941 science fiction by Isaac Asimov
 History, a 1973 book of poems by Robert Lowell
 History of Armenia of Moses of Chorene
 Natural History (Pliny) (Naturalis Historiae) of Pliny the Elder

Music

Groups
 History (band), or HISTORY, South Korean pop boy band

Albums
 History (EP), a 2004 EP by controller.controller
 History (Dune album) (2000)
 History (Jon English album) (2016)
 History (Loudon Wainwright III album) (1992)
 History (Matthew West album) (2005)
 History (Yōko Oginome album) (1995)
 HIStory: Past, Present and Future, Book I, a 1995 album by Michael Jackson
 History:, 2011 album by Grime rapper JME
 History: America's Greatest Hits, a 1975 compilation album by America
 History: Function Music, a 2012 album by E-40 and Too Short
 History: Mob Music, a 2012 album by E-40 and Too Short
 History: The Singles 85–91, a 1992 album by New Model Army

Songs
 "History" (Exo song)
 "History" (Funeral for a Friend song)
 "History" (Joel Corry and Becky Hill song)
 "History" (One Direction song)
 "History" (Story Untold song)
 "History" (The Verve song)
 "HIStory" (song), by Michael Jackson
 "History", a song by Blue System from Backstreet Dreams, 1993
 "History", a song by Cast from All Change, 1995
 "History", a song by Girls Aloud from the single "Wake Me Up", 2005
 "History", a song by Groove Armada from Black Light, 2010
 "History", a song by Jay-Z from More than a Game, 2009
 "History", a song by Julia Michaels from Not in Chronological Order, 2021
 "History", a song by Madonna from the single "Jump", 2006
 "History", a song by Megan McKenna from Story of Me, 2018
 "History", a song by Olivia Holt from Olivia, 2016
 "History", a song by Mai Tai, 1985
 "History", a song by Tenacious D from The Pick of Destiny, 2006
 "History", a song by Vassy, 2010

Periodicals
 History (journal)
 History: Magazine of the Royal Australian Historical Society
 BBC History, magazine by the British Broadcasting Association

Television
 History (American TV network) and its regional variants
 History (Australian TV channel), an Australian version of the channel
 History (Canadian TV network), a Canadian English language TV channel
 History en Español, a spin-off channel of The History Channel
 History (European TV channel)
 Viasat History, pan-Nordic television channel
 History TV18, the Indian version of History channel operated by Network18

 HIStory (web series), a Taiwanese streaming drama anthology series

Other arts, entertainment, and media 
 History (theatrical genre)

Computing
 Command history, a feature, found notably in many operating system shells, which allows users to recall, edit and rerun commands that were previously entered. The term can also be used for the variable lists found in the menus of some graphical programs that maintain, for example, a listing of recently accessed files or commands.
 history (command), an implementation of the command history feature found in many operating system shells
 HISTORY (CONFIG.SYS directive), a console history configuration setting in any issue of DR DOS
 Changelog, or history, a log or record of changes in computer projects
 Schedule (computer science), also called history, in the fields of databases and transaction processing
 Web browsing history, the log of pages a user has visited on the web

Other uses
 History, a concept in the study of internal validity which refers to events outside of a scientific experiment or between repeated measures of the dependent variable that may have effect on the experiment's internal validity
 Medical history, the history of a patient

See also

 Herstory, feminism

 Historia (disambiguation)
 Histoire (disambiguation)
 Histories (disambiguation)
 Hitstory (disambiguation)
 Natural history (disambiguation)
 Prehistory

Wikipedia material